Belonia may refer to:

Belonia, India, a town in Tripura, India
Belonia (Vidhan Sabha constituency), a legislative assembly constituency of Tripura state, centered around the town
Belonia (lichen), a genus within the family Gyalectaceae

bn:বেলোনিয়া
bpy:বেলনিয়া
it:Belonia
new:बेलोनिया
pt:Belonia
vi:Belonia